Eupterote weberi is a moth in the family Eupterotidae. It was described by Jeremy Daniel Holloway in 1976. It is found in Malaysia.

References

Moths described in 1976
Eupterotinae